Unreal TV is an Australian television show showcasing advertisements and weird video footage. It was hosted by Tim Ferguson and lasted from 1999 to 2001.

External links

Network 10 original programming
1990s Australian reality television series
1999 Australian television series debuts
2001 Australian television series endings
2000s Australian reality television series